Khalid Saleh Al-Shenaif is a retired Saudi footballer. He is currently a sports analyst and pundit for KSA Sports

Club career

Al Shabab
Al-Shenaif made his league debut in the 1990–91 season and he  became an essential element of Al Shabab squad, during his 10 years with Al Shabab he won 13 Championship most notable was winning the Saudi Premier League 3 times in a row from 1991 to 1993 and winning the Asian Cup Winners' Cup in 2000–01.

Al-Ahli
After ten years with Al Shabab, in September 2001 he transferred to Al-Ahli where he played for three years before he announced his retirement from football at age 31 in 2004. In his three years with Al-Ahli he won 4 Championship.

International goals
Scores and results list Saudi's goal tally first.

Post retirement
Following his retirement from professional football, Al-Shenaif started his sports analyst career for the Arab Radio and Television Network, he is currently a sports analyst for Dubai Sports and KSA Sports.

Honours

Al Shabab
Saudi Professional League: 1990–91, 1991–92, 1992–93; Runner-up 1997–98
Saudi Crown Prince Cup: 1993, 1996, 1999; Runner-up 1992, 1994, 2000
GCC Champions League: 1993, 1994
UAFA Club Cup: 1992, 1999
Arab Super Cup: 1995, 2000
Asian Cup Winners' Cup: 2000–01

Al-Ahli
Saudi Crown Prince Cup: 2002
Saudi Federation Cup: 2001–02
GCC Champions League: 2002
UAFA Club Cup: 2002

References
http://www.ksa-team.com/players.php?id=514
http://www.alriyadh.com/2010/06/08/article532967.html
http://www.rsssf.com/tablesa/asgames94.html
http://goool.mx/?tag=%D8%AE%D8%A7%D9%84%D8%AF-%D8%A7%D9%84%D8%B4%D9%86%D9%8A%D9%81

Living people
Sportspeople from Riyadh
Saudi Arabian footballers
Al-Shabab FC (Riyadh) players
Al-Ahli Saudi FC players
Saudi Arabia international footballers
Saudi Professional League players
Association football midfielders
Year of birth missing (living people)
Footballers at the 1994 Asian Games
Asian Games competitors for Saudi Arabia